In medicine, triage is a practice invoked when acute care cannot be provided due to a lack of resources. The process rations care towards those who are most in need of immediate care, and who will benefit most from it. More generally it refers to prioritisation of medical care as a whole. In its acute form it is most often required on the battlefield, during a pandemic, or at peacetime when an accident results in a mass casualty which swamps nearby healthcare facilities' capacity.

Triage always follows the modern interpretation of the Hippocratic oath, but otherwise there is plenty of leeway in interpretation, leading to more than one simultaneous idea of its nature. The best-settled theories and practical scoring systems used come from the area of acute physical trauma in an emergency room setting; a broken bone obviously counts for less than uncontrolled arterial bleeding, which is likely to lead to death. But no current principle carries over well to mental health, reproductive health (such as abortion), chronic medical conditions, geriatrics, or palliative care (including euthanasia). This is because triage needs to balance multiple and sometimes contradictory objectives simultaneously, most of them being fundamental to personhood: likelihood of death, efficacy of treatment, patients' remaining lifespan, ethics and religion.

History 
The term comes from the French verb , meaning to separate, sort, shift, or select.

"Structured triage" was introduced by Holy Roman Emperor Maximilian I. It was in his armies that the wounded were first categorized and treated according to an order of priority – in times of war, higher priority was given to military personnel over civilians, and the higher-ranked over the lower-ranked. The practice spread to other armies in the following centuries and was coined "triage" by the French.

Modern medical triage was invented by Dominique Jean Larrey, a surgeon during the Napoleonic Wars, who "treat[ed] the wounded according to the observed gravity of their injuries and the urgency for medical care, regardless of their rank or nationality", though the general concept of prioritizing by prognosis is foreshadowed in a 17th-century BCE Egyptian document. Triage was used further during World War I by French doctors treating the battlefield wounded at the aid stations behind the front. Those responsible for the removal of the wounded from a battlefield or their care afterwards would divide the victims into three categories:

 Those who are likely to live, regardless of what care they receive;
 Those who are unlikely to live, regardless of what care they receive;
 Those for whom immediate care may make a positive difference in outcome.

For many emergency medical services (EMS) systems, a similar model may sometimes still be applied. In the earliest stages of an incident, such as when one or two paramedics exist to 20 or more patients, practicality demands that the above, more "primitive" model will be used. However, once a full response has occurred and many hands are available, paramedics will usually use the model included in their service policy and standing orders.

As medical technology has advanced, so have modern approaches to triage, which are increasingly based on scientific models. The categorizations of the victims are frequently the result of triage scores based on specific physiological assessment findings. Some models, such as the START model may be algorithm-based. As triage concepts become more sophisticated, and to improve patient safety and quality of care, several human-in-the-loop decision-support tools have been designed on top of triage systems to standardize and automate the triage process (e.g., eCTAS, NHS 111) in both hospitals and the field. Moreover, the recent development of new machine learning methods offers the possibility to learn optimal triage policies from data and in time could replace or improve upon expert-crafted models.

Concepts in triage

Simple triage 
Simple triage is usually used in a scene of an accident or "mass-casualty incident" (MCI), in order to sort patients into those who need critical attention and immediate transport to the hospital and those with less serious injuries.  This step can be started before transportation becomes available.

Upon completion of the initial assessment by physicians, nurses or paramedical personnel, each patient may be labelled which may identify the patient, display assessment findings, and identify the priority of the patient's need for medical treatment and transport from the emergency scene.   At its most primitive, patients may be simply marked with coloured flagging tape or with marker pens.  Pre-printed cards for this purpose are known as a triage tags.

Tags 

A triage tag is a prefabricated label placed on each patient that serves to accomplish several objectives:
 identify the patient.
 bear record of assessment findings.
 identify the priority of the patient's need for medical treatment and transport from the emergency scene.
 track the patients' progress through the triage process.
 identify additional hazards such as contamination.

Triage tags may take a variety of forms.  Some countries use a nationally standardized triage tag, while in other countries commercially available triage tags are used, and these will vary by jurisdictional choice.  The most commonly used commercial systems include the METTAG, the SMARTTAG, E/T LIGHT tm and the CRUCIFORM systems.  More advanced tagging systems incorporate special markers to indicate whether or not patients have been contaminated by hazardous materials, and also tear off strips for tracking the movement of patients through the process.  Some of these tracking systems are beginning to incorporate the use of handheld computers, and in some cases, bar code scanners.

Advanced triage 

In advanced triage, specially trained doctors, nurses and paramedics may decide that some seriously injured people should not receive advanced care because they are unlikely to survive. It is used to divert scarce resources away from patients with little chance of survival in order to increase the chances for others with higher likelihoods.

The use of advanced triage may become necessary when medical professionals decide that the medical resources available are not sufficient to treat all the people who need help. The treatment being prioritized can include the time spent on medical care, or drugs or other limited resources. This has happened in disasters such as terrorist attacks, mass shootings, volcanic eruptions, earthquakes, tornadoes, thunderstorms, and rail accidents. In these cases some percentage of patients will die regardless of medical care because of the severity of their injuries. Others would live if given immediate medical care, but would die without it.

In these extreme situations, any medical care given to people who will die anyway can be considered to be care withdrawn from others who might have survived (or perhaps had less severe disability from their injuries) had they been treated instead. It becomes the task of the disaster medical authorities to set aside some victims as hopeless, to avoid trying to save one life at the expense of several others.

If immediate treatment is successful, the patient may improve (although this may be temporary) and this improvement may allow the patient to be categorized to a lower priority in the short term. Triage should be a continuous process and categories should be checked regularly to ensure that the priority remains correct given the patient's condition. A trauma score is invariably taken when the victim first comes into hospital and subsequent trauma scores are taken to account for any changes in the victim's physiological parameters. If a record is maintained, the receiving hospital doctor can see a trauma score time series from the start of the incident, which may allow definitive treatment earlier.

Reverse triage 

There are a number of concepts referred to as Reverse Triage, the first is concerned with the discharge of patients from hospital.  This makes resources available within a healthcare or hospital for incoming patients.  The second concept of Reverse Triage is utilised for certain conditions such as lightning injuries, where those appearing to be dead may be treated ahead of other patients. The third is the concept of treating the least injured, often to return them to functional capability. This approach originated in the military, where returning combatants to the theatre of war may lead to overall victory (and survivability).

Reverse Triage - Early Discharge 
Usually, triage refers to prioritizing admission.  A similar process can be applied to discharging patients early when the medical system is stressed.  This process has been called "reverse triage".  When a major wave of patients arrive to a hospital, such as immediately after a natural disaster, many hospital beds will be already occupied by regular non-critical patients. To accommodate a greater number of the new critical patients, the existing patients may be triaged, and those who will not need immediate care can be discharged until the surge has dissipated, for example through the establishment of temporary medical facilities in the region.

Undertriage and overtriage 
Undertriage is underestimating the severity of an illness or injury.  An example of this would be categorizing a Priority 1 (Immediate) patient as a Priority 2 (Delayed) or Priority 3 (Minimal). Historically, acceptable undertriage rates have been deemed 5% or less.

Overtriage is the overestimating of the severity of an illness or injury.  An example of this would be categorizing a Priority 3 (Minimal) patient as a Priority 2 (Delayed) or Priority 1 (Immediate). Acceptable overtriage rates have been typically up to 50% in an effort to avoid undertriage.  Some studies suggest that overtriage is less likely to occur when triaging is performed by hospital medical teams, rather than paramedics or EMTs.

Telephone triage 
In telephone triage, decision makers over the phone must effectively assess the patient's symptoms and provide directives based on the urgency. This should be done in a timely fashion while meeting standard guidelines in order to prevent symptoms from worsening.

General concepts in triage-based treatment options and outcomes

Palliative care 
For patients that have a poor prognosis and are expected to die regardless of the medical treatment available, palliative care such as painkillers may be given to ease suffering before they die.

Evacuation 
In the field, triage sets priorities for evacuation or relocation to other care facilities.

Alternative care facilities 
Alternative care facilities are places that are set up for the care of large numbers of patients, or are places that could be so set up. Examples include schools, sports stadiums, and large camps that can be prepared and used for the care, feeding, and holding of large numbers of victims of a mass casualty or other type of event.  Such improvised facilities are generally developed in cooperation with the local hospital, which sees them as a strategy for creating surge capacity.  While hospitals remain the preferred destination for all patients, during a mass casualty event such improvised facilities may be required in order to divert low-acuity patients away from hospitals in order to prevent the hospitals becoming overwhelmed.

Secondary (in-hospital) triage 
In advanced triage systems, secondary triage is typically implemented by emergency nurses, skilled paramedics, or battlefield medical personnel within the emergency departments of hospitals during disasters, injured people are sorted into five categories.

Some crippling injuries, even if not life-threatening, may be elevated in priority based on the available capabilities.  During peacetime, most amputation injuries may be triaged "Red" because surgical reattachment must take place within minutes, even though in all probability the person will not die without a thumb or hand.

Specific triage systems and methods

Practical applied triage 
During the early stages of an incident, first responders may be overwhelmed by the scope of patients and injuries. One valuable technique is the Patient Assist Method (PAM).  The responders quickly establish a casualty collection point (CCP) and advise, either by yelling or over a loudspeaker, that "anyone requiring assistance should move to the selected area (CCP)". This does several things at once: it identifies patients who are not so severely injured that they need immediate help, it physically clears the scene, and it provides possible assistants to the responders. As those who can move do so, the responders then ask, "anyone who still needs assistance, yell out or raise your hands"; this further identifies patients who are responsive yet may be unable to move. Now the responders can rapidly assess the remaining patients who are either expectant or are in need of immediate aid. From that point, the first responder is quickly able to identify those in need of immediate attention while not being distracted or overwhelmed by the magnitude of the situation. Using this method assumes the ability to hear.  Deaf, partially deaf, or victims of a large blast injury may not be able to hear these instructions.

Scoring systems 
The following are examples of scoring systems used:
 In Western Europe the Triage Revised Trauma Score (TRTS) is sometimes used and integrated into triage cards.
 The Injury Severity Score (ISS) is another example of a trauma scoring system. This assigns a score from 0 to 75 based on severity of injury to the human body divided into three categories: A (face/neck/head), B(thorax/abdomen), C(extremities/external/skin).  Each category is scored from 0 to 5 using the Abbreviated Injury Scale, from uninjured to critically injured, which is then squared and summed to create the ISS.  A score of 6, for "unsurvivable", can also be used for any of the three categories, and automatically sets the score to 75 regardless of other scores.  Depending on the triage situation, this may indicate either that the patient is a first priority for care, or that he or she will not receive care owing to the need to conserve care for more likely survivors.

S.T.A.R.T. model 

S.T.A.R.T. (Simple Triage and Rapid Treatment) is a simple triage system that can be performed by lightly trained lay and emergency personnel in emergencies.  It is not intended to supersede or instruct medical personnel or techniques.  It has been taught to California emergency workers for use in earthquakes.  It was developed at Hoag Hospital in Newport Beach, California for use by emergency services.  It has been field-proven in mass casualty incidents such as train wrecks and bus accidents, though it was developed  by community emergency response teams (CERTs) and firefighters after earthquakes.

Triage separates the injured into four groups:
 The expectant who are beyond help
 The injured who can be helped by immediate transportation
 The injured whose transport can be delayed
 Those with minor injuries who need help less urgently

Triage also sets priorities for evacuation and transport as follows:
 Deceased are left where they fell.  These include those who aren't breathing and repositioning their airway efforts were unsuccessful.
 Immediate or Priority 1 (red) evacuation by MEDEVAC if available or ambulance as they need advanced medical care at once or within one hour. These people are in critical condition and would die without immediate assistance.
 Delayed or Priority 2 (yellow) can have their medical evacuation delayed until all immediate people have been transported. These people are in stable condition but require medical assistance.
 Minor or Priority 3 (green) are not evacuated until all immediate and delayed persons have been evacuated.  These will not need advanced medical care for at least several hours. Continue to re-triage in case their condition worsens. These people are able to walk and may only need bandages and antiseptic.

JumpSTART triage 

The JumpSTART pediatric triage MCI triage tool is a variation of the S.T.A.R.T. model. Both systems are used to sort patients into categories at mass casualty incidents (MCIs). However, JumpSTART was designed specifically for triaging children in disaster settings. Though JumpSTART was developed for use in children from infancy to age 8, where age is not immediately obvious, it is used in any patient who appears to be a child (patients who appear to be young adults are triaged using START).

Hospital systems 
Within the hospital system, the first stage on arrival at the emergency department is assessment by the hospital triage nurse.  This nurse will evaluate the patient's condition, as well as any changes, and will determine their priority for admission to the emergency department and also for treatment.  Once emergency assessment and treatment are complete, the patient may need to be referred to the hospital's internal triage system.

For a typical inpatient hospital triage system, a triage nurse or physician will either field requests for admission from the ER physician on patients needing admission or from physicians taking care of patients from other floors who can be transferred because they no longer need that level of care (i.e. intensive care unit patient is stable for the medical floor). This helps patients flow more efficiently in the hospital.

This triage position is often done by a hospitalist. A major factor contributing to the triage decision is available hospital bed space. The triage hospitalist must determine, in conjunction with a hospital's "bed control" and admitting team, which beds are available for optimal utilization of resources in order to provide safe care to all patients. A typical surgical team will have their own system of triage for trauma and general surgery patients. This is also true for neurology and neurosurgical services. The overall goal of triage, in this system, is to both determine if a patient is appropriate for a given level of care and to ensure that hospital resources are utilized effectively.

Conventional classifications 
In an advanced triage process injured people are sorted into categories.  Conventionally there are five classifications with corresponding colors and numbers although this may vary by region.
 Black / Expectant: They are so severely injured that they will die of their injuries, possibly in hours or days (large-area burns, severe trauma, lethal radiation dose), or in life-threatening medical crisis that they are unlikely to survive given the care available (cardiac arrest, septic shock, severe head or chest wounds); their treatment is usually palliative, such as being given  painkillers, to reduce suffering.
 Red / Immediate: They require immediate surgery or other life-saving intervention, and have first priority for surgical teams or transport to advanced facilities; they "cannot wait" but are likely to survive with immediate treatment.
 Yellow / Observation: Their condition is stable for the moment but requires watching by trained persons and frequent re-triage, will need hospital care (and would receive immediate priority care under "normal" circumstances).
 Green / Wait (walking wounded): They will require a doctor's care in several hours or days but not immediately, may wait for a number of hours or be told to go home and come back the next day (broken bones without compound fractures, many soft tissue injuries).
 White / Dismiss (walking wounded): They have minor injuries; first aid and home care are sufficient, a doctor's care is not required. Injuries are along the lines of cuts and scrapes, or minor burns.

Australia and New Zealand 

The Australasian Triage Scale (abbreviated ATS and formally known as the National Triage Scale) is a triage system that is implemented in both Australia and New Zealand. The scale has been in use since 1994. The scale consists of 5 levels, with 1 being the most critical (resuscitation), and 5 being the least critical (nonurgent).

Canada 
In the mid-1980s, The Victoria General Hospital, in Halifax, Nova Scotia, Canada, introduced paramedic triage in its Emergency Department. Unlike all other centres in North America that employ physician and primarily nurse triage models, this hospital began the practice of employing Primary Care level paramedics to perform triage upon entry to the Emergency Department. In 1997, following the amalgamation of two of the city's largest hospitals, the Emergency Department at the Victoria General closed. The paramedic triage system was moved to the city's only remaining adult emergency department, located at the New Halifax Infirmary. In 2006, a triage protocol on whom to exclude from treatment during a flu pandemic was written by a team of critical-care doctors at the behest of the Ontario government.

For routine emergencies, many locales in Canada now employ the Canadian Triage and Acuity Scale (CTAS) for all incoming patients.  The system categorizes patients by both injury and physiological findings, and ranks them by severity from 1–5 (1 being highest).  The model is used by both paramedics and E/R nurses, and also for pre-arrival notifications in some cases.  The model provides a common frame of reference for both nurses and paramedics, although the two groups do not always agree on scoring. It also provides a method, in some communities, for benchmarking the accuracy of pre-triage of calls using AMPDS (What percentage of emergency calls have return priorities of CTAS 1,2,3, etc.) and these findings are reported as part of a municipal performance benchmarking initiative in Ontario.  Curiously enough the model is not currently used for mass casualty triage, and is replaced by the START protocol and METTAG triage tags.

Finland 
Triage at an accident scene is performed by a paramedic or an emergency physician, using the four-level scale of   Can wait,  Has to wait,  Cannot wait, and  Lost.

France 
In France, the Prehospital triage in case of a disaster uses a four-level scale:
 DCD: décédé (deceased), or urgence dépassée (beyond urgency)
 UA: urgence absolue (absolute urgency)
 UR: urgence relative (relative urgency)
 UMP: urgence médico-psychologique (medical-psychological urgency) or impliqué (implied, i.e. lightly wounded or just psychologically shocked).
This triage is performed by a physician called médecin trieur (sorting medic). This triage is usually performed at the field hospital (PMA–poste médical avancé, i.e. forward medical post). The absolute urgencies are usually treated onsite (the PMA has an operating room) or evacuated to a hospital. The relative urgencies are just placed under watch, waiting for an evacuation. The involved are addressed to another structure called the CUMP–Cellule d'urgence médico-psychologique (medical-psychological urgency cell); this is a resting zone, with food and possibly temporary lodging, and a psychologist to take care of the brief reactive psychosis and avoid post-traumatic stress disorder.

In the emergency department of a hospital, the triage is performed by a physician called MAO–médecin d'accueil et d'orientation (reception and orientation physician), and a nurse called IOA– infirmière d'organisation et d'accueil (organisation and reception nurse). Some hospitals and SAMU organisations now use the "Cruciform" card referred to elsewhere.

France has also a Phone Triage system for Medical Emergencies Phone Demands in its Samu Medical Regulation Centers through the 15 medical free national hot line. "Medical Doctor Regulator" decides what is to be the most efficient solution = Emergency Telemedecine or dispatch of an Ambulance, a General Practitioner  or a Physician+ Nurse + Ambulance Man, Hospital based MICU (Mobile Intensive Care Unit).

Germany 
Preliminary assessment of injuries is usually done by the first ambulance crew on scene, with this role being assumed by the first doctor arriving at the scene. As a rule, there will be no cardiopulmonary resuscitation, so patients who do not breathe on their own or develop circulation after their airways are cleared will be tagged "deceased". Also, not every major injury automatically qualifies for a red tag.  A patient with a traumatic amputation of the forearm might just be tagged yellow, have the bleeding stopped, and then be sent to a hospital when possible.  After the preliminary assessment, a more specific and definite triage will follow, as soon as patients are brought to a field treatment facility. There, they will be disrobed and fully examined by an emergency physician. This will take approximately 90 seconds per patient.

The German triage system also uses four, sometimes five colour codes to denote the urgency of treatment. Typically, every ambulance is equipped with a folder or bag with coloured ribbons or triage tags.
The urgency is denoted as follows:

Hong Kong
In Hong Kong, triage in Accident & Emergency Departments is performed by experienced registered nurses, patients are divided into five triage categories: Critical, Emergency, Urgent, Semi-urgent and Non-urgent.

Japan 
In Japan, the triage system is mainly used by health professionals. The categories of triage, in corresponding color codes, are:
 : Used for viable victims with potentially life-threatening conditions.
 : Used for victims with non-life-threatening injuries, but who urgently require treatment.
 : Used for victims with minor injuries that do not require ambulance transport.
 : Used for victims who are dead, or whose injuries make survival unlikely.

Singapore 
All public hospitals in Singapore use the Patient Acuity Category Scale (PACS) to triage patient in Emergency Departement. PACS is a symptom-based differential diagnosis approach that triages patients according to their presenting complaints and objective assessments such as vital signs and Glasgow Coma Scale, allowing acute patients to be identified quickly for treatment. PACS classifies patients into four main categories: P1, P2, P3, and P4.

Spain 
In Spain, there are 2 models which are the most common found in hospitals around the country:
 The Sistema Estructurado de Triaje (SET), which is an adaptation of the Model Andorrà de Triatge (MAT). The system uses 650 reasons for medical appointment in 32 symptomatic categories, that together with some patient information and basic exploratory data, classifies the emergency within 5 levels of urgency.     
 The "Manchester", based on the system with the same name in the UK, use 51 reasons for consultation. Through some yes/no questions, addressed in a diagram, it classifies the emergency in 5 severities.
Some autonomous communities in Spain, like Navarre and the Valencian Community, have created their own systems for the community hospitals.

United Kingdom 
In the UK, the commonly used triage system is the Smart Incident Command System, taught on the MIMMS (Major Incident Medical Management (and) Support) training program. The UK Armed Forces use this system on operations. This grades casualties from Priority 1 (needs immediate treatment) to Priority 3 (can wait for delayed treatment).  There is an additional Priority 4 (expectant, likely to die even with treatment) but the use of this category requires senior medical authority.

In the UK and Europe, the triage process used is sometimes similar to that of the United States (see below), but the categories are different:
  – patients who have a trauma score of 0 to 2 and are beyond help
  – patients who have a trauma score of 3 to 10 (RTS) and need immediate attention
  – patients who have a trauma score of 10 or 11 and can wait for a short time before transport to definitive medical attention
  –  patients who have a trauma score of 12 (maximum score) and can be delayed before transport from the scene
From April 2023, the NHS and ambulance services are to adopt the Major Incident Triage Tool, a new triage tool that will be used in mass causality incidents. This tool was a result of large multi-disciplinary review led by the NHS but its implementation became more urgent after the Manchester Arena Inquiry made it a monitored recommendation for the NHS and National Ambulance Resilience Unit to adopt.

United States
Triage in a multi-scale destruction, disaster, catastrophic, casualty event, such as following a tornado or an explosion in a populated area, first responders follow a similar triage category scale as the US military. The civilian medical industry uses a similar system for triage. Normally medical personnel aren't immediately available on scene. First responders are usually the first to arrive on scene. They could be police, fire rescue, paramedics, or community individuals with disaster training (CERT certified). They are trained to perform first aid, basic life saving and rescue techniques while performing the greatest good, for the greatest number of people. They will rapidly classify victims and sort them into 4 categories, treating quickly as they go. This system is intended to rapidly identify and classify victims for arriving transport or advanced care medical personnel such as doctors and nurses. The local National Guard and other military units responding would be using the military system of triage rather than civilian.
The triage categories are general and the names may vary by region of the nation:
 : Known as walking wounded or uninjured, green classified individuals typically require very little medical aid if any. Their injuries are minor, usually scrapes, cuts, and bruising with normal capillary refill. They can walk, function freely without assistance, are cognizant, and able to respond accurately to questioning. These individuals will sometimes be asked to assist the responder with transport and applying direct aid to other victims. They will afterwards be staged in an area to be checked more thoroughly later.
 : Yellow individuals require medical attention but it is not needed immediately. Individuals in this category may have cuts, bruises, lacerations, some confusion, minor fractures, and a capillary refill between 4 and 7 seconds (sometimes longer in cold environments). Field dressing of the wounds is usually applied quickly. Fractures are stabilized and individuals listed as green will be asked to assist with collection of yellow individuals for transport to the medical staging area.
 : Red requires immediate medical attention and will not survive if not seen soon. A person with a severe head injury, multiple fractures to the skeletal system, fractures in delicate areas such as the spinal cord, massive confusion, incohesive, unable to answer simple questions, unresponsive but with vital signs, arterial bleeding, internal bleeding, or capillary refill exceeding 7 seconds is classified red. Immediate aid is applied to stop external arterial bleeding and airways are adjusted to ensure un-obstruction as they are carefully moved to a medical staging area, usually with the aid of those marked green or unable to provide medical assistance.
 : Individuals listed as black have died. The person's pulse and breathing is checked to confirm no vitals present. In low-scale disaster with few victims involved, immediate CPR is started in attempt to revive the vital signs. In larger events with more victims, the head is positioned to open the airway, the body is rolled onto its side and the responder will move on to the next victim. The positioning is done so if the body's vitals return, vomiting will not be as likely to choke the victim. The bodies will not be collected until all surviving individuals have been removed from the immediate disaster area. There will be a body collection staging area set up away from any medical staging areas. Usually this will begin the recovery phase.

United States military
A battlefield situation, however, requires medics and corpsmen to rank casualties for precedence in MEDEVAC or CASEVAC. The casualties are then transported to a higher level of care, either a Forward Surgical Team or Combat Support Hospital and re-triaged by a nurse or doctor. In a combat situation, the triage system is based solely on resources and ability to save the maximum number of lives within the means of the hospital supplies and personnel.

The triage categories (with corresponding color codes), in precedence, are:
 : The casualty requires immediate medical attention and will not survive if not treated soon. Any compromise to the casualty's respiration, hemorrhage control, or shock control could be fatal.
 : The casualty requires medical attention within 6 hours. Injuries are potentially life-threatening, but can wait until the Immediate casualties are stabilized and evacuated.
 : "Walking wounded," the casualty requires medical attention when all higher priority patients have been evacuated, and may not require stabilization or monitoring.
 : The casualty is expected not to reach higher medical support alive without compromising the treatment of higher priority patients. Care should not be abandoned, spare any remaining time and resources after Immediate and Delayed patients have been treated.

Afterwards, casualties are given an evacuation priority based on need:
 Urgent: evacuation is required within two hours to save life or limb.
 Priority: evacuation is necessary within four hours or the casualty will deteriorate to "Urgent".
 Routine: evacuate within 24 hours to complete treatment.

In a "naval combat situation", the triage officer must weigh the tactical situation with supplies on hand and the realistic capacity of the medical personnel.  This process can be ever-changing, dependent upon the situation and must attempt to do the maximum good for the maximum number of casualties.

Field assessments are made by two methods: primary survey (used to detect & treat life-threatening injuries) and secondary survey (used to treat non-life-threatening injuries) with the following categories:
 Class I: Patients who require minor treatment and can return to duty in a short period of time. Class II: Patients whose injuries require immediate life sustaining measures.
 Class III: Patients for whom definitive treatment can be delayed without loss of life or limb.
 Class IV''': Patients requiring such extensive care beyond medical personnel capability and time.

Limitations of current practices 
Notions of mass casualty triage as an efficient rationing process of determining priority based upon injury severity are not supported by research, evaluation and testing of current triage practices, which lack scientific and methodological bases. START and START-like (START) triage that use color-coded categories to prioritize provide poor assessments of injury severity and then leave it to providers to subjectively order and allocate resources within flawed categories. Some of these limitations include:
 lacking the clear goal of maximizing the number of lives saved, as well as the focus, design and objective methodology to accomplish that goal (a protocol of taking the worst Immediate – lowest chances for survival – first can be statistically invalid and dangerous)
 using trauma measures that are problematic (e.g., capillary refill) and grouping into broad color-coded categories that are not in accordance with injury severities, medical evidence and needs. Categories do not differentiate among injury severities and survival probabilities, and are invalid based on categorical definitions and evacuation priorities
 ordering (prioritization) and allocating resources subjectively within Immediate and Delayed categories, which are neither reproducible nor scalable, with little chance of being optimal
 not considering/addressing size of incident, resources, and injury severities and prioritization within its categories – e.g., protocol does not change whether 3, 30 or 3,000 casualties require its use, and regardless of available resources to be rationed
 not considering differences in injury severities and survival probabilities between types of trauma (blunt versus penetrating, etc.) and ages
 resulting in inconsistent tagging and prioritizing/ordering of casualties and substantial overtriage

Research indicates there are wide ranges and overlaps of survival probabilities of the Immediate and Delayed categories, and other START limitations. The same physiologic measures can have markedly different survival probabilities for blunt and penetrating injuries. For example, a START Delayed (second priority) can have a survival probability of 63% for blunt trauma and a survival probability of 32% for penetrating trauma with the same physiological measures – both with expected rapid deterioration, while a START Immediate (first priority) can have survival probabilities that extend to above 95% with expected slow deterioration. Age categories exacerbate this. For example, a geriatric patient with a penetrating injury in the Delayed category can have an 8% survival probability, and a pediatric patient in the Immediate category can have a 98% survival probability. Issues with the other START categories have also been noted. In this context, color-coded tagging accuracy metrics are not scientifically meaningful.

Poor assessments, invalid categories, no objective methodology and tools for prioritizing casualties and allocating resources, and a protocol of worst first triage provide some challenges for emergency and disaster preparedness and response. These are clear obstacles for efficient triage and resource rationing, for maximizing savings of lives, for best practices and National Incident Management System (NIMS) compatibilities, and for effective response planning and training.

Inefficient triage also provides challenges in containing health care costs and waste. Field triage is based upon the notion of up to 50% overtriage as being acceptable. There have been no cost-benefit analyses of the costs and mitigation of triage inefficiencies embedded in the healthcare system. Such analyses are often required for healthcare grants funded by taxpayers, and represent normal engineering and management science practice. These inefficiencies relate to the following cost areas:
 tremendous investment in time and money since 9/11 to develop and improve responders' triage skills
 cited benefits from standardization of triage methodology, reproducibility and interoperability, and NIMS compatibilities
 avoided capital costs for taxpayer investment in additional EMS and trauma infrastructure
 wasteful daily resource utilization and increased operating costs from acceptance of substantial levels of overtriage
 prescribed values of a statistical life and estimated savings in human lives that could reasonably be expected using evidence-based triage practices
 ongoing performance improvements that could reasonably be expected from a more objective optimization-based triage system and practices

Ethical considerations
Because treatment is intentionally delayed or withheld from individuals under this system, triage has ethical implications that complicate the decision-making process. Individuals involved in triage must take a comprehensive view of the process to ensure fidelity, veracity, justice, autonomy, and beneficence are safeguarded.

Ethical implications vary between different settings and the type of triage system employed, culminating in no single gold-standard approach to triage. Emergency departments are advised to preemptively plan strategies in attempts to mitigate the emotional burden on these triage responders. While doing so, standards of care must be maintained to preserve the safety of both patients and providers.

There is widespread agreement among ethicists that, in practice, during the COVID-19 pandemic triage should prioritize "those who have the best chance of surviving" and follow guidelines with strict criteria that consider both short-term and long-term survivability. Likewise, the triage of other health services has been adjusted during the pandemic to limit resource strain on hospitals.

Utilitarian approach and critique 
Under the utilitarian model, triage works to maximize the survival outcomes of the most people possible. This approach implies that some individuals may likely suffer or die, in order for the majority to survive. Triage officers must allocate limited resources and weigh an individual's needs along with the needs of the population as a whole.

Some ethicists argue the utilitarian approach to triage is not an impartial mechanism, but rather a partial one that fails to address the social conditions that prevent optimal outcomes in marginalized communities, rendering it a practical but inadequate means of distributing health resources.

Special population groups 
There is wide discussion regarding how VIPs and celebrities should be cared for in the emergency department. It is generally argued that giving special considerations or deviating from the standard medical protocol for VIPs or celebrities is unethical due to the cost to others. However, others argue that it may be morally justifiable as long as their treatment does not hinder the needs of others after assessing overall fairness, quality of care, privacy, and other ethical implications.

Proposed frameworks in conflict 
A variety of logistical challenges complicate the triage and ultimate provision of care in conflict situations. Humanitarian actors acknowledge challenges like disruptions in food and medical supply chains, lack of suitable facilities, and existence of policies that prohibit administration of care to certain communities and populations as elements that directly impede the successful delivery of care. The logistical realities of humanitarian emergencies and conflict situations threatens the bioethical principle of beneficence, the obligation to act for the benefit of others.

Technical challenges of triage in conflict settings 
To address the ethical concerns that underpin triage in conflict situations and humanitarian crises, new triage frameworks and classification systems have been suggested that aim to uphold human rights. Scholars have argued that new frameworks must prioritize informed consent and rely on established medical criteria only in order to respect the human rights considerations set forth by the Geneva Convention of 1864 and the Universal Declaration of Human Rights, but no comprehensive triage model has been adopted by international bodies.

Veterinary triage
Emergency veterinarian Jessica Fragola wrote in 2022 about the ethics of animal triage. She said that pressures on veterinarians having been exacerbated by staffing shortages that resulted from the Covid pandemic, coupled with growth in spending on veterinary care and on pet insurance.

See also 

 Combat stress reaction
 Glasgow coma scale
 Hospital emergency codes
 Mass decontamination
 Remote patient monitoring
 Wilderness first aid

References

External links 
 
 

 
Emergency management
First aid
French medical phrases
Intensive care medicine